The Chinese Basketball Association (not to be confused with the basketball league of the same English-language name) was the successful bid for the right to host the 2019 FIBA Basketball World Cup. On 16 March 2015, the bid became a formal candidate together with the Philippines, as FIBA decided that the 2019 World Cup will be played in Asia. China officially won the bid against the Philippines on 7 August 2015.

Timeline

Details
A number of sites were proposed as venues for the Basketball World Cup.

FIBA underlined some requirements for the venues to be used:
 There should be at least a minimum of 4-5 venues; 2 venues for the knock-out stage
 A press center 150 pax for the group stage and 300 pax for the final round, 2 square meters per person

Venues
There are eight venues proposed by the Chinese bid committee:

Notes

References

External links
 
 

2019 FIBA Basketball World Cup
2015–16 in Chinese basketball
2014–15 in Chinese basketball
FIBA Basketball World Cup bids